Curle may refer to:

People
Adam Curle (1916–2006), British academic and Quaker peace activist
Gerald Curle (1893–1977), English cricketer
Gilbert Curle (died 1609), secretary of Mary, Queen of Scots
James Curle (archaeologist) (1862–1944), archaeologist, ceramologist (sigillata), and discoverer of the Newstead Helmet
J. H. Curle (died 1942), Canadian philatelist
Keith Curle (born 1963), former English professional footballer
Richard Curle (1883–1968), Scottish author, traveller and bibliophile
Tom Curle (born 1986), former English professional footballer
Walter Curle or Curll (1575–1647), English bishop
Willie Curle, Scottish footballer

Places
Curles Neck Plantation (also known as Curles Neck Farm) in the Varina district of Henrico County, Virginia, United States

Businesses
Seawind Barclay Curle, British shipbuilding company